The New Zealand Free Speech Union (FSU) is an organisation that advocates for freedom of speech. It was formed as the Free Speech Coalition in 2018 and relaunched as the Free Speech Union in 2021.

Goals and organisation
The Free Speech Union's stated goal is to defend and promote the free exchange of information and to educate people of the importance of free speech in New Zealand. Despite its connections to the right-wing New Zealand Taxpayers' Union, the group also claims support from both sides of the political and ideological spectrum.  The group has also opposed hate speech legislation and censorship.   

Since 2021, the NZ Free Speech Union is led by chief executive Jonathan Ayling, a former adviser to National Party Members of Parliament David Bennett and Simeon Brown. By October 2022, the Union claimed 1,500 paid-up members and 70,000 supporters. Since 2021, the organisation has two full-time staff based in Wellington as well as a part-time communications specialist. Notable members and supporters of the Union have included former National Party leader Judith Collins, ACT Party leader David Seymour, former Labour Party Chief of Staff Matt McCarten, left-wing journalist Chris Trotter, Auckland University of Technology history professor Paul Moon, University of Auckland academic and Jewish community leader David Cumin, and Taxpayers' Union co-founder Jordan Williams. 

The FSU is the first sister group of the Free Speech Union of the UK and uses the name under license. It is a registered trade union based in Wellington, New Zealand. Reflecting its close relationship with the Taxpayers' Union, the two organisations' offices are located next to each other.

History
The Coalition established by four people including lawyer, lobbyist, and New Zealand Taxpayers' Union founder Jordan Williams in July 2018 in response to the Mayor of Auckland Phil Goff's decision to cancel a speaking event featuring alt-right speakers Lauren Southern and Stefan Molyneux at an Auckland Council-owned venue. The Coalition twice unsuccessfully challenged the cancellation at the High Court and the Court of Appeal. For its High Court challenge, the Coalition raised NZ$150,000 from over 2,000 donors.

During the 2019 Bay of Plenty local elections, the Free Speech Coalition criticised the Rotorua Lakes District Council for investigating mayoral candidate Reynold MacPherson for hate speech after he made comments likening Councillor Tania Tapsell to the Pied Piper of Hamelin. Coalition spokesperson Dr David Cumin emphasized that the New Zealand Bill of Rights Act 1990 "clearly stated everyone had the right to freedom of expression, including the freedom to seek, receive, and impart information and opinions of any kind in any form."

In June 2021, the FSU filed two successful legal challenges on behalf of the "gender-critical" group "Speak Up For Women" to speak on public premises. In addition, the Union mobilised opposition to the Sixth Labour Government's proposed hate speech laws in 2021. 80% of the 18,000 submissions on the hate speech legislation endorsed the FSU's submission opposing the law. As a result, the proposed legislation was shelved.   

In November 2021, the Free Speech Union supported Otago Regional Council councillor Michael Laws, who was the subject of a code of conduct investigation over his criticism of Council staff in the Otago Daily Times newspaper. The Union's Chief Executive Jonathan Ayling urged Council chief executive Sarah Gardner to withdraw her complaint and called for the Council's code of conduct to be amended, claiming that it was being used as a "gagging order" to silence elected councillors who were representing ratepayers. The Union also offered its support to Laws. Laws was subsequently cleared of wrongdoing by the investigation.

In November 2021, the Free Speech Union expressed support for seven University of Auckland academics (the so-called "Listener Seven") who had been censured by the Royal Society for writing a controversial letter in the New Zealand Listener in July 2021 disputing the scientific legitimacy of Mātauranga Māori (indigenous Māori knowledge). The Royal Society also launched an investigation of three of the "Listener Seven," who were Fellows of the Royal Society. In response, Ayling urged other academics to defend science at their "own peril" and accused the Royal Society of "abandoning its own heritage and tradition of academic freedom." In response, the Free Speech Union created an academic freedom fund in December 2021 to support two of the academics under investigation including Garth Cooper.

On 15 August 2022, the Free Speech Union released its first Annual Universities Ranking Report, which graded New Zealand universities based on whether they encouraged free speech and freedom of expression on their campus. The only university to receive a "fail grade" was Auckland University of Technology, which the organisation alleged consistently opposed free speech and did not fulfill its role as a "critic and conscience" of society.

On 18 August 2022, the Free Speech Union held a public speaking event at the University of Otago's Dunedin campus featuring former broadcaster Peter Williams, Dunedin City councillor Lee Vandervis, and National Party Member of Parliament Michael Woodhouse. MPs from the Labour and Green parties declined to participate at the FSU-sponsored event.

In early March 2023, the Free Speech Union defended Avondale Library's decision to host a drag queen storytime on free speech grounds, likening it to their earlier defence of Bethlehem College in Tauranga's decision to teach the traditional view of marriage in 2022. The reading session organised by "Pride Fest Out West" had been picketed by protesters who claimed that the event promoted child grooming.

References

Further reading

External links
New Zealand Free Speech Union (official website)

2021 establishments in New Zealand
Freedom of speech
Organizations established in 2021
Non-profit organisations based in New Zealand
Civil liberties advocacy groups
Trade unions in New Zealand